Prador Moon is a science fiction novel in Neal Asher's Polity series. It describes the First Contact between the Prador and Polity and some of the battles in the ensuing war.

2006 British novels
2006 science fiction novels
British science fiction novels
Night Shade Books books